Peñon woman or Peñon Woman III is the name for the human remains, specifically a skull, of a Paleo-Indian woman found by an ancient lake bed in Pueblo Peñón de los Baños in Mexico City in 1959.

Discovery
Peñon Woman III was found on an island in the middle of Lake Texcoco.

The skeleton's age has been estimated by radiocarbon dating by Silvia Gonzalez of Liverpool John Moores University. Her 14C date is 10,755±55 years (12,705 cal years) BP.  

She is one of the oldest human remains found in the Americas.

Gonzalez theorizes that Peñon woman is related to the historic Pericú people of Baja California, who also shared similar physical traits.

See also

Archaeology of the Americas
Arlington Springs Man – (Human remains)
Buhl woman – (Human remains)
Calico Early Man Site – (Archeological site)
Cueva de las Manos  – (Cave paintings)
Fort Rock Cave – (Archeological site)
Kennewick Man – (Human remains)
List of unsolved deaths
Luzia Woman – (Human remains)
Kwäday Dän Ts'ìnchi – (Human remains)
Marmes Rockshelter – (Archeological site)
Paisley Caves  – (Archeological site)
Leanderthal Lady – (Human remains)
Forensic anthropology

Notes

References
 Grattan, John and Robin Torrence, eds. Living Under the Shadow: Cultural Impacts of Volcanic Eruptions. Walnut Creek, CA: Left Coast Press, 2007. .

1959 archaeological discoveries
Archaeological sites in the State of Mexico
Human remains (archaeological)
Indigenous Mexicans
Oldest human remains in the Americas
Paleo-Indian archaeological sites in Mexico
Paleo-Indian period
Indigenous peoples in Mexico City